State and Local Government Review is a quarterly, peer-reviewed, academic journal on public administration. Since 2021, the co-editors are Kimberly Nelson (University of North Carolina, Chapel Hill) and Eric Zeemering (University of Georgia). The journal was established in 1968 as the Georgia Government Review by the Carl Vinson Institute of Government (the Institute of Government until 1983; University of Georgia) and is the official journal of the Section on Intergovernmental Administration and Management of the American Society for Public Administration. It obtained its current title in 1976 and continued to be published by the Institute of Government until 2010. Currently, the journal is published by SAGE Publications.

Abstracting and indexing 
State and Local Government Review is abstracted and indexed in:

Editors-in-chief 
The following persons have been editors-in-chief of the journal:
2006-2020 Michael Scicchitano (University of Florida) 2003-2005 Thomas J. Pavlak (University of Georgia)
1986-2002 Richard W. Campbell (University of Georgia)
1983-1985 Joseph W. Whorton (University of Georgia)
1976-1982 C. David Billings (University of Georgia)
1974-1975 John B. Legler (University of Georgia)
1970-1971 Angela W. Reaves (University of Georgia)
1968-1969 Daniel G. Boserup (University of Georgia)

See also 
 List of public administration journals

References

External links 
 

SAGE Publishing academic journals
English-language journals
Political science journals
Quarterly journals
Publications established in 1968